John Noel William "Sam" Newman (born 22 December 1945) is a former Australian rules footballer who played for the Geelong Football Club in the Victorian Football League (VFL).

A talented and athletic player who served a football apprenticeship under the legendary Graham "Polly" Farmer, Newman became the Cats' main ruckman after Farmer departed at the end of 1967, overcoming a number of serious injuries throughout his career to become the first Geelong player to reach 300 senior VFL games.

After retiring in 1980, Newman served as a specialist ruck coach at various AFL clubs and forged a notable career in the media, particularly with Melbourne-based radio station 3AW and the Nine Network as a panel member of The Footy Show, one of the network's most popular and often controversial programs

Early life
Newman attended Geelong Grammar School, where his father was a teacher.

He made his debut for Geelong in 1964 when he was 18 years old. Early in his time at Geelong he acquired the nickname "Sam", by which he is now usually known.

Football career
During the first semi-final against Collingwood in 1967, Newman suffered a serious injury which forced surgeons to remove part of his kidney. He was also selected as an All-Australian player in 1969. He played for the Victorian state team eight times.

1980 was to be Newman's last season as a VFL footballer. In Round 4 against  at Arden Street Oval, Newman kicked five goals playing as centre half-forward, four of the goals coming in the last quarter, in a 37-point win. Geelong coach Bill Goggin praised his former teammate after the match: "He is such an inspiration to the players. They have told me that just having him out there with them gives everyone a lift". Newman reached his 300th senior VFL game in Round 20 against Collingwood at Kardinia Park. Although he had a quiet game, the Cats managed to celebrate the occasion with an 18-point win. NOTE: Some time after the end of Newman's playing career, certain games were not recognised as official VFL/AFL matches and hence were removed from players' game tallies.

In 2002, he was inducted into the Australian Football Hall of Fame.

In December 2005, Newman was appointed as ruck coach for the Melbourne Football Club to mentor players such as Jeff White, Mark Jamar and Paul Johnson.

On 6 July 2010, Newman played in a charity match playing for Victoria in the annual EJ Whitten Legends Game. He kicked four goals from four kicks and three marks to be named best on ground, despite his team losing to the All Stars by seven points.

Media career
Newman joined radio station 3AW as a football commentator in 1981 and continued with the station until the end of the 1999 season. He also appeared on World of Sport on Channel 7 for seven years from 1981 to 1987 and had a column in The Sun News-Pictorial newspaper during the late 1980s.

Newman first joined the Nine Network in 1989, appearing on a sports segment on In Melbourne Today with Ernie Sigley and Denise Drysdale. In 1992 he was a reporter on Melbourne Extra, a short-lived local current affairs show. He was a panel member of The Sunday Footy Show from 1993 to 1998.

Newman was on The Footy Show (AFL) from when it first aired in 1994 until 2018 on the Nine Network. Other media appearances have included the Sunday sports show Any Given Sunday in 2005, World of Sport, The Sunday Footy Show and also co-hosting the short lived Sam and The Fatman with Paul Vautin. On radio station Triple M, Newman previews Friday night and Saturday afternoon matches. He formerly provided special comments during AFL games on Triple M, as well as 3AW previously.
From April 2010, he was a part of the Melbourne Talk Radio lineup, providing opinion and participating in talkback between 9.00 am and 9.30 am, during the Steve Price breakfast program. Newman quit the station in January 2012, after the breakfast producer censored Newman's profanity.

In February 2018, he joined a podcast with former Herald Sun chief football writer Mike Sheahan and former St Kilda coach Grant Thomas entitled Sam, Mike and Thomo. The podcast aired once weekly and covered all trending topics, with a sprinkling of AFL commentary. In March 2019 it was announced by Newman on social media that the podcast would not proceed due to him being perceived to be making fun of transgender people on a prior episode of the podcast. However, in August he revived the podcast, starring Sheahan and former VFL footballer Don Scott, entitled Sam, Mike & Don, You Cannot Be Serious. It was aired with this name until June 2020, when upon Sheahan quitting for a second time due to the fallout of comments made by Scott about former AFL footballer Nicky Winmar, it was renamed to You Cannot Be Serious.

In December 2018, Eddie McGuire announced that Newman had signed a new multi-year deal with Nine; however, The Footy Show, of which Newman had been a part of with McGuire since the show started in March 1994, was replaced by a completely new formatted football show in 2019. Newman and McGuire were meant to host four Footy Show "specials" in 2019, but upon it being announced in May 2019 that The Footy Show would no longer be aired, this was cancelled.

In June 2020, Newman announced that he would no longer appear on the Nine Network.

Controversies
Newman has regularly been a controversial figure during his media career, with some of his most controversial incidents on The Footy Show including:

 Wearing blackface to impersonate legendary Indigenous AFL footballer Nicky Winmar in 1999 after Winmar did not attend a scheduled appearance on the program
 Having his trousers pulled down by Shane Crawford live on-air in 2001
 Hitting an unsuspecting David Schwarz with a pie in the face during an appearance on The Footy Show, with Schwarz responding by shoving Newman to the ground
 Manhandling and groping a lingerie-clad mannequin with journalist Caroline Wilson's face attached to it in 2008 in response to the way Wilson was dressed on Footy Classified. Newman was suspended by the Nine Network after the incident
 Describing five female directors of AFL clubs as "liars and hypocrites" after they complained about Newman's mannequin skit, leading one of those directors, Susan Alberti, to sue the Nine Network for $220,000
 Smoking a bong on-air in 2012 after the AFL banned marijuana as a game-day substance; the substance in the bong was later revealed to be tea leaves
 Describing NFL draftee Michael Sam as "annoyingly gratuitous" in 2014 after the openly homosexual player kissed his boyfriend on live television on being drafted to the NFL
In 2015, there were questions raised after Newman made remarks about Mitch Clark's depression issues
 Referring to transgender celebrity Caitlyn Jenner as "he" and "it" in 2017 (See also: preferred gender pronoun)
 Staging a silent protest and refusing to speak throughout an episode in 2017 after producers refused to allow him to dress up as a woman in response to two senior AFL executives were exposed as having had affairs with junior staffers; the Nine Network responded by taking The Footy Show off air for four weeks, sacking Craig Hutchison as host, and replacing him with Eddie McGuire
Ranting about the AFL Commission's decision to publicly support the "yes vote" in the Australian Marriage Law Postal Survey, which would pave the way for legalising same-sex marriage
Describing the newly elected U.S. President Joe Biden as "mentally retarded and has special needs" on Twitter

In June 2020, Newman arrived at a mutual agreement with the Nine Network to resign from the network after he stated in a podcast that while George Floyd died as a consequence of police brutality, Floyd's extensive criminal record meant he was a "piece of shit".

The following week, Newman engaged in a conversation with Don Scott and Mike Sheahan on the podcast in which they cast doubt that Nicky Winmar's famous jumper raise in 1993 was about Winmar responding to racism, with Scott and Sheahan instead suggesting that they believed it was to signify a "gutsy" effort. Winmar and photographer Wayne Ludbey took legal action against Newman, Scott and Sheahan, alleging defamation, with the parties reaching an agreement during mediation involving a formal apology and an undisclosed donation to an Indigenous charity.

Motorsport
Newman had a brief career in motor racing. He began racing in 1998 in Class C of the Australian GT Production Car Championship where he finished in 10th place in a Ford EL Falcon XR8. In the 1999 Australian GT Production Car Championship he raced a Holden Vectra GL to third place in Class D driving for Gibson Motorsport. He then went on to finish in fourth place in Class D at the 1999 Poolrite GTP Bathurst Showroom Showdown driving with Melinda Price. He then drove the Vectra to fifth place in Class E in the 2000 Australian GT Production Car Championship. He also raced a V8 Supercar at the support races at the Australian Grand Prix in the same year. Running a Gibson Motorsport prepared VS Commodore, he finished 25th, 24th and 23rd in the three races across the weekend.

In 2001, Newman raced a Ferrari 360 Challenge for Prancing Horse Racing as a teammate to multiple Australian champions (in various categories) and Bathurst 1000 winner John Bowe in the 2001 Australian Nations Cup Championship finishing in 14th place. In the 2002 Championship, Newman acquitted himself well and improved to finish 10th in the series

Newman's brightest moment in motor racing was when he put his Ferrari on pole position for the 2002 Sandown 500. Newman benefited in the Top 10 shootout for pole as he was the first driver on the track. Before the next driver went out the rain came down and Newman ended up over 6 seconds faster than the 2nd placed Porsche 996 GT3 of racing legend Jim Richards. Newman and co-driver Scott Shearman went on to finish the race 6th outright.

Newman defected to Team Lamborghini for the 2003 Australian Nations Cup Championship and driving the V12 Lamborghini Diablo SVR and GTR models improved to finish 7th outright in the championship. He finished the series in 9th place in Group 1 and 3rd place in Group 2.

After leaving motor racing at the end of 2003, Newman would again race in the 2009 and 2010 Mini Challenge Australia championships, both times at the Albert Park round in the Uber Star Celebrity Car.

Career results
Results sources from:

Personal life
Newman lives in Docklands, Melbourne. In 2002, he released a compilation album entitled I Do My Best Work After Midnight, consisting of 13 selections from other artists, as well as two songs sung by himself: "Witchcraft" and "I've Got You Under My Skin". In 2008 he was treated for prostate cancer, and he allowed Channel Nine's program 60 Minutes to film the operation. Following the operation, he was cleared of the cancer.

He has been married four times. His last wife, Amanda Brown, died aged 50 in May 2021 despite Newman desperately trying to revive her using CPR for 20–30 minutes. The two had been together for 20 years, only getting married in late 2020, about six months before her death. Newman recorded an emotional tribute to his late wife on his podcast You Cannot Be Serious.

References

External links
 
 
 
 The Footy Show AFL official website

1945 births
Living people
Geelong Football Club players
Geelong Football Club captains
Australian Football Hall of Fame inductees
All-Australians (1953–1988)
Carji Greeves Medal winners
Australian rules football commentators
Australian television presenters
Triple M presenters
People educated at Geelong Grammar School
Australian rules footballers from Geelong